Retraining or refresher training is the process of learning a new or the same old skill or trade for the same group of personnel. Retraining is required to be provided on a regular basis to avoid personnel obsolescence due to technological changes and the individuals' memory capacity.  This short-term instruction course shall serve to re-acquaint personnel with skills previously learnt (recall to retain the potentials) or to bring their knowledge or skills up-to-date (latest) so that skills stay sharp. This kind of training could be provided annually or more frequently as maybe required, based on the importance of consistency of the task of which the skill is involved.  Examples of refreshers are cGMP, GDP, HSE trainings.  Retraining (repetition of a training conducted earlier) shall also be conducted for an employee, when the employee is rated as ‘not qualified’ for a skill or knowledge, as determined based on the assessment of answers in the training questionnaire of the employee.

Affected people 

The need to retrain workers is often thought to apply to older members of the workforce, many of whom saw their occupations disappear and their skills lose value as technology, outsourcing and a weak economy combined to erode their ability to make a living. While older Americans do not face as high a rate of unemployment as the country’s teenagers and young adults, when they do find themselves unemployed, they remain unemployed for more than twice as long as teenagers.

While the stereotype for retraining needs is the older worker, youth in the United States and across the European Community (OECD) and Africa suffer from the same problem. The gap between the skills they possess and those that employers are actively seeking is significant and stagnating to their employment prospects. Currently in the United States, psychology, history and the performing arts make up 22% of college degrees earned. Demand for skilled employees, however, is in the areas of technology and engineering, currently at 5% of conferred degrees. “In both Britain and the United States, many people with expensive liberal arts degrees are finding it impossible to get decent jobs,” reports the Economist in its April 27, 2013 issue, adding that in northern Africa, job applicants with degrees face an unemployment level twice that of non-degreed candidates.

While technology anxiety and a nervousness about learning new processes and acquiring new skill sets has impacted older workers, younger job seekers are also facing a deficit of “applied soft skills” such as work ethic, social skills, communication and leadership.

Policy issues 
The need for greater partnership and transfer of information between institutions of higher education is essential in reducing the skills gap for old and young people alike. Expanded internships, returnships, and post-hiring training can help from the employers’ perspective  and upgraded and more authentic technical training will help close the gap on the side of educators.  The World Bank's 2019 World Development Report on the future of work  explains that flexible learning opportunities at universities and adult learning programs that allow workers to retrain and retool are vital in order for labor markets to adjust to the future of work.

There is some controversy surrounding the use of retraining to offset economic changes caused by free trade and automation. For example, most studies show that displaced factory workers in the United States on the average have lower wages after retraining to other positions when a factory is closed due to offshoring. A similar issue surrounds movement from technical jobs to liaison jobs due to offshore outsourcing.  Such changes may also favor certain personality types over others, due to the changing tasks and skills required. Other research estimates that one academic year of such retraining at a community college increases the long-term earnings by about 8 percent for older males and by about 10 percent for older females.

Government policy may make a difference in employability and motivation for retraining and re-entry into the workforce for older workers. In economies with greater regulations surrounding the hiring, termination and wages, reductions in unemployment were difficult to achieve. The very groups harmed by continued higher unemployment were those that the regulations sought to protect.

Retraining is sometimes offered as part of workfare programs, which may include support for transportation, childcare, or an internship.

Health effects of unemployment 
As difficult and controversial as it may seem, retraining older and younger workers alike to prepare them to be part of a changing workforce will have a lasting impact on workers across the globe. Unemployed workers are at significantly greater risk for poor physical health, greater stress, alcoholism, marital problems and even suicide. Among young workers, beginning their careers with extended bouts of joblessness results in lower overall earnings and more unemployment throughout their careers.

See also 

 Efficiency
 Labor shortage
 Standardization
 Sustainability
 Trade Adjustment Assistance
 Vocational rehabilitation

References

Training

fr:Reconversion